Stary Dębsk  is a village in the administrative district of Gmina Nowa Sucha, within Sochaczew County, Masovian Voivodeship, in east-central Poland.

The village has an approximate population of 100.

References

Villages in Sochaczew County